The cultural heritage of Peru, officially the Cultural heritage of the Nation, is the name given to the set of goods, both tangible and intangible, accumulated over time. These goods can be paleontological, archaeological, architectural, historical, artistic, military, social, anthropological or intellectual. In Peru, the competence for the protection of cultural heritage is in the hands of the Ministry of Culture.

In August 2000, the National Institute of Culture published a list of temples, convents and cemeteries declared cultural heritage.

Classification
In Peru, cultural heritage is regulated by Law No. 28296 (General Law of Cultural Heritage of the Nation), which establishes the national policy for the defense, protection, promotion, ownership and legal regime and the destination of the goods that constitute the Cultural Heritage of the Nation.

Categories
Immovable material heritage: Those cultural assets that cannot be moved, including archaeological sites and colonial and republican buildings.
Movable tangible heritage: Heritage objects that can be moved.
: Cultural manifestations of living culture.
Underwater cultural heritage: cultural vestiges that have been totally or partially submerged in water, continuously or periodically, for at least 100 years.
Documentary heritage: Printed or digital documentation kept in archives and similar institutions.
Industrial heritage: Real estate and personal property acquired or produced in connection with industrial activities, products generated and related documentation.

See also
Culture of Peru
Historic Centre of Lima
List of World Heritage Sites in Peru

References

Peruvian culture